Ferrisia is a genus of mealybugs.

Taxonomic history
David T. Fullaway circumscribed the genus in 1923. He included one species: F. virgata, which was initially described in Dactylopius and had been transferred to Pseudococcus. In 1929, Ryoichi Takahashi proposed Ferrisiana as a replacement name because he thought the existence of the mollusk genus Ferrissia meant Ferrisia was an invalid junior homonym. Ferrisiana was subsequently used by other authors to refer to this genus. In the 1960s, Harold and Emily R. Morrison and Howard L. McKenzie showed that the International Code of Zoological Nomenclature says the difference of one letter is enough to distinguish genera names, making Ferrisia the valid name for the genus.

In 2012, M. B. Kaydan and P. J. Kullan circumscribed a new genus Pseudoferrisia for the species previously known as Ferrisia floridana.

Species
, species include:

 Ferrisia claviseta 
 Ferrisia colombiana 
 Ferrisia cristinae 
 Ferrisia dasylirii 
 Ferrisia ecuadorensis 
 Ferrisia gilli   Formerly thought to be a California population of F. virgata. Economically important pest of pistachios in and almonds in the state.
 Ferrisia kaki 
 Ferrisia kondoi 
 Ferrisia malvastra 
 Ferrisia meridionalis 
 Ferrisia milleri 
 Ferrisia multiformis 
 Ferrisia pitcairnia 
 Ferrisia quaintancii 
 Ferrisia setosa 
 Ferrisia terani 
 Ferrisia uzinuri 
 Ferrisia virgata 
 Ferrisia williamsi

References

Sternorrhyncha genera
Pseudococcidae